Pyle House may refer to:

Howard Pyle Studios, Wilmington, DE, listed on the NRHP in Delaware
Joshua Pyle House and Wagon Barn, Wilmington, DE, listed on the NRHP in Delaware
Pyle-Davis House, Demorest, GA, listed on the NRHP in Georgia
Glenn O. and Lucy O. Pyle House, Marion, IA, listed on the NRHP in Iowa
Ernie Pyle House, Albuquerque, NM, listed on the NRHP in New Mexico
Pyle House (Huron, South Dakota), listed on the NRHP in South Dakota